WCCU may refer to:

 WCCU (TV), a television station (channel 36, digital 27) licensed to Urbana, Illinois, United States
 WCCU (student radio), an internet-only radio station serving Coastal Carolina University in Conway, South Carolina, United States